Alpha Scuti, Latinized from α Scuti, is an orange-hued star in the southern constellation of Scutum. Originally part of the Aquila constellation, alpha Scuti was a latter designation of 1 Aquilae. It is faintly visible to the naked eye with an apparent visual magnitude of 3.83. Based upon an annual parallax shift of 16.38 mas as seen from the Earth, it is located around 199 light years from the Sun. It is moving away from the Sun with a radial velocity of +36.5 km/s.

Properties 
With a stellar classification of K3 III, the spectrum indicates it is an evolved giant star of type K. Alpha Scuti is a suspected variable star with magnitude range reported as 3.81 to 3.87. The star has an estimated 1.33 times the mass of the Sun, but the outer envelope has expanded to 20 times the Sun's radius. It is radiating 186 times the Sun's luminosity from its inflated photosphere at an effective temperature of 4,315 K.

References

External links 
 EAAS: Scutum
 

Suspected variables
K-type giants
Scutum (constellation)
Scuti, Alpha
BD-08 4638
171443
091117
6973
TIC objects